The Legacy of Bhikhari Thakur is a Bhojpuri language documentary folk album by Assamese Bhojpuri singer Kalpana Patowary, originally written by Bhikhari Thakur. It was released by London-based music label EMI/Virgin records on 14 May 2012 by the Vice Prime Minister of Mauritius Anil Bachoo and Arts and Cultural Minister Mookhesswur Choonee in the Prime Minister’s office in Mauritius.

The album comprises nine tracks, all of which were written by Bhikari Thakur and Kalpana Patowary using minimal acoustics. The album starts with Bhikari parichay, an autobiographical narrative rendered by Kalpana. On the track Kalyug prem, Bhikhari Thakur talks about the anguish of women whose husbands have become addicted to alcohol. The song relates, "Born into a family of barbers, he, like many of his fellow natives, moved to Calcutta for work". Although he later wrote songs questioning the redundant ways and customs of the society, Bhikhari was initially illiterate. "It was a baniya in Calcutta who taught him to read and write," Kalpana said. He then returned to his village and formed the Bhikari Thakur Natak Mandali.

Track listing

Awards 
The Legacy of Bhikhari Thakur was nominated as Best Folk Album in the non-film music category in GIMA 2013 Global Indian Music Academy awards.

Footnotes

References 

 ‘The legacy of Bhikhari Thakur’ nominated for GIMA Times of India
 GiMA 2013 NOMINEES: NON-FILM MUSIC CATEGORY@ http://www.gima.co.in/2013_non_film_nominees.php
 Mauritius PM releases Kalpana Patowary’s Bhojpuri musical documentation - The Legacy of Bhikhari Thakur@ http://www.radioandmusic.com/content/editorial/news-releases/mauritius-pm-releases-kalpana-patowary%E2%80%99s-bhojpuri-musical-documentation-the-legacy-bhikh
 Bhikhari Thakur's Bhojpuri legacy goes international@ http://post.jagran.com/bhikhari-thakurs-bhojpuri-legacy-goes-international-1341121334
 The Hindu - On the Shakespeare of Bhojpuri - A Bhojpuri music album for Rs.195. Quite unusual, most would say, but singer Kalpana Patowary has clinched that deal with EMI / Virgin Records@ http://www.thehindu.com/todays-paper/tp-features/tp-metroplus/article3534122.ece
 Telegraph - The Legacy of Bhikhari Thakur@ 
 Jaha Khub bikti hai Aslilta waha jadoo Bikhrega Kalpana Ka Yeh Album@ http://www.bhaskar.com/article/BIH-the-legacy-of-bhikhari-thakur-3304564.html?HF-13=
 Zee News - Bhikhari Thakur`s Bhojpuri legacy goes international@ http://zeenews.india.com/entertainment/art-and-theatre/bhikhari-thakur-s-bhojpuri-legacy-goes-international_114415.htm
 IBNLive - Bhojpuri Poet Bhikhari Thakur's legacy goes international@ http://ibnlive.in.com/news/poet-bhikhari-thakurs-legacy-goes-international/268828-45-75.html
 Bhikhari Thakur’s Bhojpuri legacy goes international@ http://english.manoramaonline.com/cgi-bin/mmonline.dll/portal/ep/contentView.do?contentId=11912677&tabId=1&programId=11565536
 Bhikhari Thakur’s Bhojpuri legacy goes international@ http://www.bengalnewz.com/india/new_delhi/070121697.html

2012 albums
Kalpana Patowary albums